Jur Schryvers (born 11 March 1997) is a Belgian footballer who plays as a defender for K.M.S.K. Deinze in the Belgian First Division B.

References

External links

1997 births
Living people
Belgian footballers
Belgium under-21 international footballers
Belgium youth international footballers
S.K. Beveren players
Belgian Pro League players
Association football defenders